Can Peixauet is the name of a Barcelona Metro line 9 station named after Avinguda de Can Peixauet, situated in Santa Coloma de Gramenet municipality.

The station was opened in December 2009 with the opening of the line from Can Zam to this station. It is located under Avinguda de Can Peixauet and Avinguda de Santa Coloma, and it was built like many other new L9 metro stations with a 40-metres-depth and 25-metres-diameter well. The station is divided in four levels: the upper hall, the pre-platform, the upper platform and the lower platform. The upper hall has an only access from the street equipped with escalators and elevators. The upper hall has also ticket vending machines and a TMB Control Center. The upper platform is where run the trains in direction to La Sagrera and the lower platform is where run the trains in direction to Can Zam station. The architectural design of the station was designed by Sanchez-Piulachs Architects.

Gallery

External links
Transports Metropolitans de Barcelona
Information about L9 metro station
Information about L9 metro station at Trenscat.com

Barcelona Metro line 9 stations
Railway stations in Spain opened in 2009
Transport in Santa Coloma de Gramenet